Assiniboia Airport  is located  north of Assiniboia, Saskatchewan, Canada.

During World War II the aerodrome was part of the British Commonwealth Air Training Plan.

See also
 RCAF Station Assiniboia
 List of airports in Saskatchewan

References

External links
 Page about this airport on COPA's Places to Fly airport directory

Registered aerodromes in Saskatchewan
Airports of the British Commonwealth Air Training Plan
Lake of the Rivers No. 72, Saskatchewan